Hello Jai Hind! is a 2011 Marathi-language Indian film directed by Gajendra Ahire, starring Nitin Chandrakant Desai and Trupti Bhoir. The film follows the story of a person and the trouble he faces in the society, when he takes on life only through the right path.

Cast
Nitin Chandrakant Desai
Trupti Bhoir
Kedar Shinde
Vinay Apte
Murli Sharma
Ravindra Mankani
Amita Khopkar
Vibhavari Deshpande
Yatin Karyekar
Ameya Zare
Apoorva Kulkarni

Soundtrack
The music for Hello Jai Hind! is composed by Illayaraja. This is Illayaraja's first outing in Marathi films.

"Lautke Aane De"
"Ganjyaleela" - Hariharan
"Dhol Vajato"
"Jagdish Gharat" 
"Aaganat Umalle"

References 

2010s Marathi-language films
2011 films
Films directed by Gajendra Ahire
Films scored by Ilaiyaraaja